Granotoma dissoluta is a species of sea snail, a marine gastropod mollusk in the family Mangeliidae.

Distribution
This species occurs in the Sea of Japan.

References

 Baba, K. 1990. Moluscan Fossil Assemblages of Kazusa Group, South Kwanto, Central Japan. Keio Yochisha, Tokyo. 445 pp. (in Japanese)

External links
 
 Takeo Ichikawa, Catalogue of type and illustrated specimens in the department of historical geology and palaeontology of the University Museum~ University of Tokyo

dissoluta
Gastropods described in 1926